Hjalte Froholdt (born August 20, 1996) is a Danish professional American football guard for the Arizona Cardinals of the National Football League (NFL). He was drafted by the New England Patriots in the fourth round of the 2019 NFL Draft. He played college football at Arkansas.

Early years 
Froholdt began playing football in his native Denmark for the Svendborg Admirals. After spending his sophomore year as an exchange student at Warren G Harding high school in Warren, Ohio, he returned to Denmark and played for the U-19 youth team of the Søllerød Gold Diggers.  He then attended IMG Academy in Bradenton, Florida, his senior year before signing to play with the University of Arkansas.

College career 
Froholdt was recruited to Arkansas by then–head coach Bret Bielema, who in 2019 was the defensive line coach for the New England Patriots.

In 2015, Froholdt played as a defensive lineman for the Razorbacks before switching to the offensive line in 2016. He played 13 games at left guard in 2016 and another 12 in 2017, not allowing a sack in 2017. He played three games at center in 2018 before moving back to left guard.

In 2019, Froholdt worked Super Bowl LIII as a broadcaster for the Danish media.

Professional career

New England Patriots
Froholdt was drafted by the New England Patriots in the fourth round (118th overall) of the 2019 NFL Draft. He is only the second native of Denmark to be drafted by an NFL team (the first was kicker Morten Andersen in 1982).

On August 31, 2019, he was placed on injured reserve as a result of a shoulder injury he sustained in Week 4 of preseason against the New York Giants.

On November 21, 2020, Froholdt was waived by the Patriots.

Houston Texans
On November 23, 2020, Froholdt was claimed off waivers by the Houston Texans. He was placed on the reserve/COVID-19 list by the team on December 17, 2020, and activated on January 13, 2021.

On August 31, 2021, Froholdt was waived by the Texans and re-signed to the practice squad.

Cleveland Browns
On October 5, 2021, Froholdt was signed by the Cleveland Browns off the Houston Texans' practice squad. He was waived on November 27 and re-signed to the practice squad. Froholdt was elevated to the Browns' active roster as a COVID-19 replacement player on December 24, 2021.

The Browns signed Froholdt to a reserve/futures contract on January 10, 2022.

Arizona Cardinals
On March 15, 2023, Froholdt signed a two-year contract with the Arizona Cardinals.

References 

1996 births
Living people
American football offensive linemen
Arizona Cardinals players
Arkansas Razorbacks football players
Cleveland Browns players
Danish expatriate sportspeople in the United States
Danish players of American football
Houston Texans players
New England Patriots players
People from Svendborg
Sportspeople from the Region of Southern Denmark